This is a list of songs written by Stephen Foster (1826-1864) including those published posthumously. Foster may have written words and/or music for each song.

Several of Foster's songs have alternate titles which are included in the "Title" column along with the original title. The original title is always given first.

Table

References

External links
Stephen Foster Detailed Song List, Songwriters Hall of Fame

Foster, Stephen, List of songs written by